The first elections to the Nagaland Legislative Assembly were held in January 1964 to elect members of the 40 constituencies in Nagaland, India. There were no political parties registered and so all the candidates fought as Independents. P. Shilu Ao was appointed as the first Chief Minister of Nagaland.

Nagaland was converted to a state by the State of Nagaland Act, 1962 and elections were called for in 1964.

Result

Elected Members

Bypolls

See also
List of constituencies of the Nagaland Legislative Assembly
1964 elections in India

References

Nagaland
State Assembly elections in Nagaland
1964